The Karen national football team represents the Karen people, a ethnic group in Kayin State, Myanmar. They are not affiliated with FIFA and therefore cannot compete for the FIFA World Cup. Instead, they are part of ConIFA and can compete in their competitions.

History

Karen joined ConIFA in 2019.

References

Asian national and official selection-teams not affiliated to FIFA
CONIFA member associations
North American national and official selection-teams not affiliated to FIFA